Souvenirs is a studio album by Greek singer Demis Roussos, released in 1975 on Philips Records.

Commercial performance 
The album reached no. 25 in the UK and no. 13 in the Netherlands. It also spent 21 weeks in the Norwegian chart, peaking at no. 2.

Track listing

Charts

Certifications

References 

1975 albums
Demis Roussos albums
Philips Records albums